The NW type F is a veteran automobile manufactured by Nesselsdorfer Wagenbau-Fabriks-Gesellschaft A.G. (NW, now known as Tatra) in 1902. Only three cars of the design were made.

The car was able to reach speed of 60 km/h.

References

Cars of the Czech Republic
Tatra vehicles
Cars introduced in 1905
Brass Era vehicles
Front mid-engine, rear-wheel-drive vehicles